The Morelia Institute of Technology (in ), also known as Morelia Tech (Tec de Morelia), is a public university in Morelia, Michoacán, México founded in 1964.

Academics

Undergraduate programs
 Mechanical Engineering
 Industrial Engineering
 Electrical Engineering
 Electronics Engineering
 Computer Engineering
 Biochemical Engineering
 Materials Science
 Administration
 Enterprise Management Engineering
 Computer Science
 Information Technologies and Communications
 Accounting

Graduate programs
 Master of Industrial Engineering 
 Master of Science in Mechanical Engineering
 Master of Science in Electrical Engineering
 Master of Science in Electronical Engineering
 Master of Science in Metallurgy
 Master of Science in Computer Sciences

Doctoral programs
 Electrical Engineering
 Engineering Science (Electronics, Materials Technologies and Metallurgical Sciences)

Student life

Students can create student groups and participate in a number of events running every year. They can choose to take many recreational activities in the areas of athletics and the arts.

References

External links
Official site (in Spanish)

Universities and colleges in Michoacán